is a passenger railway station located in the city of Yokkaichi, Mie Prefecture, Japan, operated by the private railway operator Sangi Railway.

Lines
Ōyachi Station is served by the Sangi Line, and is located 2.5 kilometres from the terminus of the line at Kintetsu-Tomida Station.

Layout
The station consists of a single island platform connected to the station building by a level crossing.

Platforms

Adjacent stations

History
Ōyachi Station was opened on July 23, 1931.

Passenger statistics
In fiscal 2019, the station was used by an average of 369 passengers daily (boarding passengers only).

Surrounding area
Yokkaichi Municipal Oyachikojo Elementary School
Kurube Kanga ruins

See also
List of railway stations in Japan

References

External links

Sangi Railway official website

Railway stations in Japan opened in 1931
Railway stations in Mie Prefecture
Yokkaichi